Neuropsychology (journal) is a peer-reviewed academic journal that was established in 1987 and covers neuropsychology. It is published by the American Psychological Association.

The journal has implemented the Transparency and Openness Promotion (TOP) Guidelines.  The TOP Guidelines provide structure to research planning and reporting and aim to make research more transparent, accessible, and reproducible. 

The current editor-in-chief is Gregory G. Brown (UC San Diego School of Medicine). The journal publishes original, empirical research on the relation between brain and human cognitive, emotional, and behavioral function.

According to the Journal Citation Reports, the journal has a 2020 impact factor of 3.295.

References

External links 
 

English-language journals
American Psychological Association academic journals